The Albatross is a novella written by Susan Hill, first appearing in the collection The Albatross and Other Stories published by Hamish Hamilton in 1971. It won the John Llewellyn Rhys Prize in 1972. It appeared as a standalone book published by Penguin Books in 2000. It is studied in GCSE English as an example of the best of modern women's writing.

Plot introduction
The Albatross centers around Duncan, an intellectually disabled 18-year-old who has grown up with his domineering wheelchair-using mother in Heype, a Suffolk seaside town based on Aldeburgh. Duncan finds it difficult to cope with anything outside his daily routine but is forced to interact with the wider world when his claustrophobic relationship with his mother reaches a breaking point.

Inspiration
The story was partly inspired by local composer Benjamin Britten's opera Peter Grimes.

References

External links
review of collection from Saturday Review Pub Date: Aug. 18th, 1975

See also 
 List of works by Susan Hill

1971 British novels
British novellas
Novels by Susan Hill
John Llewellyn Rhys Prize-winning works
Novels set in Suffolk
Social realism
Hamish Hamilton books
Penguin Books books
Aldeburgh